Santiago Agustín Villarreal (born 28 February 1996) is an Argentine footballer who plays for Deportivo Armenio.

References

External links

Argentine footballers
1996 births
Living people
Club Atlético Tigre footballers
Deportivo Armenio footballers
Club Luján footballers
Argentino de Merlo footballers
Argentine Primera División players
Association football defenders
Footballers from Buenos Aires